Robert Rees may refer to:

 Robert Rees (cricketer) (1882-1966), Australian cricketer
 Robert Rees (singer) (1841–1892), Welsh singer
 Robert Rees (journalist) (1938–2005), American journalist
 Robert A. Rees (born 1935), American educator and poet

See also
Robert Reece (disambiguation)
Robert Rhys, editor of Barn magazine